Chen Haosu (born 1942) is a Chinese poet and politician. He served as Chairman of the Chinese People's Association for Friendship with Foreign Countries from 2000 to 2011. He is also President of the China International Friendship Cities Association, China-Russia Friendship Association and China-EU Association.

Born in May 1942, Chen is son of the late Marshal and Foreign Minister Chen Yi.
He graduated from the University of Science and Technology of China with a Bachelor's Degree in Science
and served successively as Secretary of the China Youth League Central Committee,
Deputy Secretary of the CPC Fengtai Committee,
Vice Mayor for the Beijing Municipality,
Vice Minister of the Film and Television Bureau
and member of the 9th CCPCC National Committee.

Apart from his political involvement, Chen used to be researcher at the PLA Academy of Military Science.
He now serves in the Global Executive Committee and as Asia-Pacific President of the United Cities and Local Governments.

He is also a published poet.

Works

Honors 
 Order of Friendship of Russia, 1992.
 Order of Merit of Ukraine, 3rd Class, 2010.
 Order of the Rising Sun, 2nd Class, Gold and Silver Star, 2012.

References 

1942 births
Living people
Beijing Foreign Studies University alumni
Beijing No. 4 High School alumni
Chinese Esperantists
Chinese Communist Party politicians from Jiangsu
Deputy mayors of Beijing
People's Republic of China poets
People's Republic of China politicians from Jiangsu
Poets from Jiangsu
Politicians from Yancheng
University of Science and Technology of China alumni
Writers from Yancheng
Nanyang Model High School alumni
Recipients of the Order of Merit (Ukraine), 3rd class
Recipients of the Order of the Rising Sun, 2nd class
Delegates to the 4th National People's Congress
Delegates to the 5th National People's Congress
Delegates to the 6th National People's Congress
Members of the 9th Chinese People's Political Consultative Conference
Members of the Standing Committee of the 10th Chinese People's Political Consultative Conference
Members of the Standing Committee of the 11th Chinese People's Political Consultative Conference